Henry North Haslam (5 June 1879 – 13 October 1942) was a British footballer who played as an outside-left. He represented Great Britain at the 1900 Olympic Games in Paris, where he won a gold medal as the captain of the Upton Park club team.

Born in Worksop, his father was the estate manager for the Duke of Newcastle's estates in Newark and Nottingham. Haslam attended Uppingham School and played football and cricket for Worksop.

He played for Tonbridge, with whom he toured Belgium in 1900, and with Upton Park during four continental tours. He also played for Tunbridge Wells, Barnet, and West Norwood.

Haslam was a reservist with the West Yorkshire Regiment between 1915 and 1920. In 1926, he was convicted for shopbreaking and sentenced to 12 months imprisonment with hard labour, and in 1937 was imprisoned for three months for theft.

References

External links

1879 births
1942 deaths
Footballers from Worksop
People educated at Uppingham School
English footballers
Association football outside forwards
Olympic gold medallists for Great Britain
Olympic footballers of Great Britain
Footballers at the 1900 Summer Olympics
Olympic medalists in football
Tonbridge Angels F.C. players
Tunbridge Wells F.C. players
Barnet F.C. players
West Norwood F.C. players
Upton Park F.C. players
British people convicted of theft
Medalists at the 1900 Summer Olympics
British Army personnel of World War I
West Yorkshire Regiment soldiers